Sandra Ma Sichun (born 14 March 1988) is a Chinese actress of Hui ethnicity.  She is noted for her roles in the films The Left Ear (2015) and Soul Mate (2016), for which she won the Golden Horse Award for Best Leading Actress alongside her co-star Zhou Dongyu; and in television series Love Me If You Dare (2015) and Age of Legends (2018).

Early life
Ma was born in Bengbu, Anhui on March 14, 1988, to Jiang Wenjuan, a broker. Her aunt, Jiang Wenli is a noted actress. Ma graduated from Communication University of China.

Career

Beginnings
Ma Sichun began her career as a child actress at age 7, when she appeared in The Winter of Three Persons, which stars Jiang Wenli and Zhao Jun. 5 years later at the age of 13, she starred in The Grand Mansion Gate. Both productions co-star her aunt, Jiang Wenli.

Ma became well known after working as a book cover model for Rao Xueman's novel Joy & Sorrow. Thereafter, she was chosen as the female lead by director Shen Yan for the television series Lover, based on the novel Daddy, I have your baby. In 2012, Ma won the Golden Phoenix Awards for Best Newcomer for her performance in the film Time Flies Soundlessly.

2015–present: Rising popularity and acclaim

Ma achieved wider recognition after starring in the coming-of-age film The Left Ear, directed by Alec Su. Her role as the rebellious and daring Li Bala received acclaim from critics and she was nominated as Best Supporting Actress at the Golden Horse Awards. The same year, she co-starred with Wallace Huo in the hit crime drama Love Me If You Dare, which contributed to her rise in popularity.

In 2016, Ma starred in adventure film Time Raiders, based on the popular tomb-raiding novel series Daomu Biji. The same year, she starred in romance film Soul Mate, playing the beautiful, kind yet rebellious protagonist. Ma won the Golden Horse Award for Best Leading Actress alongside her co-star Zhou Dongyu.

In 2017, Ma was cast as the female protagonist in the third installment of the Detective Dee film series by Tsui Hark. She also starred in the campus romance film Nuts.

In 2018, Ma starred alongside William Chan in the crime action drama Age of Legends. Forbes China listed Ma under their 30 Under 30 Asia 2017 list  which consisted of 30 influential people under 30 years old who have had a substantial effect in their fields. Ma also starred in chinese variety show Who's the Keyman.

In 2019, Ma starred in Lou Ye's crime film, The Shadow Play; and romance drama film Somewhere Winter written by Rao Xueman.
The same year, she was cast in period romance film Love After Love, directed by Ann Hui.
On the small screen, Ma starred in the romance comedy drama Mr. Fighting alongside Deng Lun.

In 2020, Ma was cast in the military romance drama You Are My Hero as a medic. The same year, she starred in youth drama film Wild Grass.

Filmography

Film

Television series

Discography

Singles

Awards and nominations

Forbes China Celebrity 100

References

External links

Living people
1988 births
Chinese film actresses
Chinese television actresses
Communication University of China alumni
People from Bengbu
Hui actresses
21st-century Chinese actresses
Actresses from Anhui